Wisel Creek is a stream in Fillmore County, in the U.S. state of Minnesota.

Wisel Creek was named for David Weisel, a pioneer who built two mills near its mouth in the 1850s.

Portions of Wisel Creek are designated by the Minnesota Department of Natural Resources as a trout stream.

See also
List of rivers of Minnesota

References

Rivers of Fillmore County, Minnesota
Rivers of Minnesota
Southern Minnesota trout streams
Driftless Area